Rommell Jhoan Ibarra Hernández (born 24 March 2000) is a Venezuelan footballer who plays as a defender for Deportivo La Guaira.

Career
On 5 February 2021, FC Pyunik announced the signing of Ibarra on loan from Deportivo La Guaira. On 6 December 2021, Pyunik announced that Ibarra had left the club after his contract had expired.

Career statistics

Club

Notes

References

2000 births
Living people
Venezuelan footballers
Venezuela under-20 international footballers
Venezuela youth international footballers
Venezuelan expatriate footballers
Association football defenders
Venezuelan Primera División players
Armenian Premier League players
Deportivo La Guaira players
FC Pyunik players
Expatriate footballers in Armenia
21st-century Venezuelan people